Western Paradise is a settlement in the Belize District of Belize in Central America. According to the 2010 census, Western Paradise had a population of 1,258 people in 348 households.

History 

In 2010 Western Pines, Sunset Park and Mile 8 Community were incorporated under one name, Western Paradise.

Location and geographic setting 
Western Paradise is located on mile 8 of the George Price Highway. In 2020 the John Smith Road was constructed heading north through the village.

References 

Populated places in Belize District
Belize Rural Central